Tōji may refer to:

 Tō-ji, a temple in Kyoto, Japan
 Tōji Station, a railway station on the Kintetsu Kyoto Line in Minami-ku, Kyoto, Japan that gives access to the temple
 Dongzhi (solar term) in pīnyīn (Tōji in rōmaji), is the 22nd solar term in the traditional East Asian calendar
 The job title of a Japanese sake brewer
 Toji Suzuhara, a fictional character from the anime Neon Genesis Evangelion
 Touji Sakata, a fictional character from the fighting game Fatal Fury

See also 

 Toji (disambiguation)